The year 1973 saw a number of significant events in radio broadcasting history.

Events
 4 June – KFMH flips from its beautiful music format to alternative rock, using the slogan "99 Plus." The first song is reportedly "I've Seen All Good People" by Yes. The new station quickly gains a cult following and a reputation for playing music and showcasing genres and local artists ignored by other stations.
 15 October – Dutch public-broadcasting station Hilversum 3 begins round-the-clock transmission.

No dates
 KWNT-FM (106.5 FM) of Davenport, Iowa switches from country music to beautiful music and light easy listening, with the new call letters KRVR (with the slogan "K-River"). The new format will become the signature of the frequency for the next 22 years, but leaves the Quad-Cities market without a full-time FM country music station for most of the next five years. KWNT's AM station (1580 AM) remains country.
 André Baruch and his wife move to Palm Beach, Florida to do a top-rated daily four-hour talk show for five years before relocating to Beverly Hills, California.

Debuts
 Unknown date - DWFM 92.3, owned by Nation Broadcasting Corporation in Manila, Philippines signs on the air, becoming the third FM station in the nation's capital.
 February 5 - WABB-FM in Mobile, Alabama signs on, initially simulcasting its sister AM station and maintaining a top 40/CHR format until March 1, 2012. The first song played was Stuck Inside of Mobile with the Memphis Blues Again by Bob Dylan, which would be repeated upon WABB-FM's 2012 signoff.
 February 23 - DWLL in Manila, Philippines signs on the air as WLL 94.7 or Mellow Touch 94.7 one of the pioneer FM stations that did not have live announcers and music DJs in their programming.
 May 16 - URB 963, a student radio station at the University of Bath begins broadcasting
August 27 - WCCO-FM (now KMNB) relaunches with new 100,000 watt signal.
 October 6 — American Country Countdown, a country music-oriented version of American Top 40 featuring the top 40 songs of the week based on Billboard magazines Hot Country Singles chart. Created by Don Bustany and Casey Kasem and distributed by Watermark Inc., the host is Don Bowman, who would remain with the program for 4½ years.
 October 8 - LBC (later London News 97.3 and News Direct 97.3FM, now LBC 97.3), the first Independent Local Radio station in the United Kingdom, begins broadcasting to the London area.
 October 16 - Capital Radio (later Capital FM, now Capital 95.8) begins broadcasting to the London area.
 December 31 - Radio Clyde (later Clyde 1, now 102.5 Clyde 1'''), the first independent local radio station outside London, and the first in Scotland, begins broadcasting to the Glasgow area.

Closings
 The Feminine Forum concept dropped by KGBS, becoming the Bill Ballance ShowBirths
 March 9 - Uribe DJ, Colombian radio personality and television host
 April 18 - Jad Abumrad, American radio host, co-founder of Radiolab on public radio
 June 22 - Carson Daly, American radio and television personality, host of Last Call with Carson Daly'' on NBC

Deaths
January 11, Isabel Randolph, 83, American character actress in radio and film from the 1940s through the 1960s and in television from the early 1950s to the middle 1960s
January 24, J. Carroll Naish, 76, American character actor
June 1, Walter Greaza, 76, American actor
June 6, Jimmy Clitheroe, 51, English comic entertainer
July 25, Edgar Stehli, 89, American actor
October 27, Howard Marshall, 73, English radio commentator

References

 
Radio by year